Von Guerard Stream is a glacial meltwater stream, 2.5 nautical miles (4.6 km) long, which flows northwest from the unnamed glacier east of Crescent Glacier to enter Lake Fryxell close east of Harnish Creek, in Taylor Valley, Victoria Land. The name was suggested by Diane McKnight, leader of United States Geological Survey (USGS) teams which made extensive studies of the hydrology of streams in the Lake Fryxell basin, 1987–94. Named after hydrologist Paul B. von Guerard, a member of the field team in three seasons, 1990–94, who assisted in establishing stream gaging stations on streams flowing into Lake Fryxell in the 1990–91 season.

Rivers of Victoria Land
McMurdo Dry Valleys